The Retreat & Reflection Garden (Suzhou Wu: The sy yoe) is a notable classical garden in China. It is located in Tongli, Wujiang, Jiangsu, China. In 2001, it was recognized with the other Classical Gardens of Suzhou as a UNESCO World Heritage Site.

History 
The garden was built in 1885 by Ren Lansheng, an imperial official working in Anhui province who was impeached.  The name of the garden comes from a verse by Zho Zhuan in Zhuo Qiuming's Chronicles, "Lin Fu really is a gentleman when he forwards proposals, he shows loyalty to his country, when he retreats he reflects and mends his ways".  The garden was designed by Yuan Long, a painter of the Wumen school.

Design
The  garden is divided into an eastern residential area, a western main garden court with two minor courtyards attached to it.  The design of this garden is innovative in that is uses an east–west axis as the main axis as opposed to the traditional north–south axis.  The layout of buildings around the pool in the main courtyard uses the near-the-water style of placing the buildings back from the waters edge and keeping the water level high.  This part of the garden is named: "The Garden Floating on Water."

See also
Chinese garden
Suzhou

Notes

References

External links

UNESCO World Heritage Site page for Classical Gardens of Suzhou

Classical Gardens of Suzhou
Major National Historical and Cultural Sites in Jiangsu